The 2001 Calder Park V8 Supercar round was the seventh round of the 2001 Shell Championship Series. It was held on the weekend of 14 to 15 July at the Calder Park Raceway in Melbourne, Victoria. This would also be the 25th and last time that Calder Park Raceway would host a round of the V8 Supercar Championship Series.

Race report 

Paul Morris obtained his first V8 Supercar win as well as his first round win. This would also be the last time the V8 Supercars would race at Calder Park Raceway, although it does still remain a testing facility for some V8 Supercar teams to the present day.

Race results

Qualifying

Top Ten Shootout

Race 1

Race 2

Race 3

Championship Standings

References

Calder Park